HD 29587 is a Sun-like star with a candidate brown dwarf companion in the northern constellation of Perseus. It has an apparent visual magnitude of 7.29, which means it is too faint to be viewed with the naked eye. The star is moving away from the Earth with a heliocentric radial velocity of +113 km/s, having come to within  some 148,000 years ago. It is a hyper-velocity halo star moving at a rate of 170 km/s relative to the local standard of rest.

This ancient star has a stellar classification of G2 V, matching a G-type main-sequence star. It has 78% of the mass of the Sun and is radiating 80% of the Sun's luminosity from its photosphere at an effective temperature of 5,709 K.

Planetary system
Formerly an IAU radial velocity standard, this star was found to have a variable radial velocity due to a suspected orbiting companion. The secondary object most likely has a mass in the range , making it a probable brown dwarf.

References

G-type main-sequence stars
Brown dwarfs
Perseus (constellation)
J04413631+4207065
BD=+41 931
029587
021832